Metaphysical terms in René Guénon's works contains the definition of some metaphysical terms used in René Guénon's writings.

In his metaphysical writings, René Guénon has stated precise definitions concerning key terms in metaphysics. This article summarizes some of them. Guénon's writings make use of words and terms, of fundamental signification, which receive a precise definition throughout his books. These terms and words, although receiving a usual meaning and being used in many branches of human sciences, have, according to René Guénon, lost substantially their original signification (e.g. words such as "metaphysics", "initiation", "mysticism", "personality", "form", "matter"). This article provides the definition given by René Guénon to some of the words used extensively in his works.

Definitions

Notes and references

Concepts in metaphysics
Esotericism